Shoemaker Glacier is a tributary glacier in the Southern Cross Mountains of Antarctica, flowing east along the south side of Daley Hills to Aviator Glacier, in Victoria Land. Mapped by United States Geological Survey (USGS) from surveys and U.S. Navy air photos, 1960–64. Named by Advisory Committee on Antarctic Names (US-ACAN) after Lieutenant (later Captain) Brian H. Shoemaker, U.S. Navy, helicopter pilot with Squadron VX-6 at McMurdo Station, 1967.

Glaciers of Victoria Land
Borchgrevink Coast